Dimitrije Merzlikin (born 6 November 1914, date of death unknown) was a Slovenian gymnast. He competed in eight events at the 1936 Summer Olympics.

References

External links
 

1914 births
Year of death missing
Slovenian male artistic gymnasts
Olympic gymnasts of Yugoslavia
Gymnasts at the 1936 Summer Olympics
Place of birth missing